Mohiniyaattam is a 1976 Indian Malayalam film, directed by Sreekumaran Thampi. The film stars Adoor Bhasi, Lakshmi, T. R. Omana and Nilambur Balan in the lead roles. The film has musical score by G. Devarajan. P. S. Nivas won the National Film Award for Best Cinematography for the film. The film won three Filmfare Awards South.

Cast

 Adoor Bhasi as Krishnan
 Lakshmi as Mohini
 T. R. Omana as Nalini
 Nilambur Balan as Panikker
 P. N. Menon as Artist K. M. Panicker
 Maniyanpilla Raju as Job hunter
 Babu Nanthankode as Prospected groom
 K. P. Ummer as Narendran
 Kanakadurga as Anasooya
 M. G. Soman as Venu
 Mallika Sukumaran as Ranjini
 Master Rajakumaran Thampi as Young Chinthu
 T. P. Madhavan as Nalini's husband
 Jagathy Sreekumar as Ranjini's lover
 Vijayan as Reporter Kutty
 Vanchiyoor Radha as Nirmala's Aunt
 Mancheri Chandran as Hotel Receptionist
 P. R. Menon as Industrialist
 Prathapachandran as Raghavan Nair
 Haripppad Soman as House maid
 Girija as Sreedevi
 Master Sekhar as Chintu

Soundtrack
The music was composed by G. Devarajan and the lyrics were written by Sreekumaran Thampi and Jayadevar.

Reception 
B. N. Reddy wrote, "Mohiniyattam is a well produced, artistic and thought-provoking picture. Lakshmi's brilliant acting, the direction and the photography are the highlights." The Sunday Standard wrote, "A good film for woman's libbers and those who fight against a cruel, selfish, debauched male-oriented society. A good theme and great ideals significantly a boost to the anti-dowry movement." The Times of India wrote, "Thampi lands Indianness to the women's liberation movement by emancipating Mohini through a vicarious realization of her motherhood." The Economic Times wrote, "Lakshmi's performance is memorable, even great at times. Thampi tries to say something different from the run of the mill film." Screen wrote, "In its best moments Mohiniyattam is a fine piece of celluloid art replete with visually beautiful scenes and poetic imagery. It is also one of the most meaningful tributes paid to women by the commercial cinema and it should be valued for this if not for anything else."

Awards
Filmfare Awards South - 1976
Best Film - Malayalam - Raji & Thapsi
Best Director - Malayalam - Sreekumaran Thampi
Best Actress - Malayalam - Lakshmi

References

External links
 

1976 films
1970s Malayalam-language films
Films whose cinematographer won the Best Cinematography National Film Award
Indian feminist films
Films about women in India
Films directed by Sreekumaran Thampi